Jean-Ismaïla Niang (born December 25, 1987 in Dakar) is a Senegalese professional football player, who currently plays in the Championnat National for Roye.

Career
He played on the professional level in Ligue 2 for Amiens SC.

Notes

1987 births
Living people
Senegalese footballers
Senegalese expatriate footballers
Expatriate footballers in France
Ligue 2 players
Amiens SC players
Pau FC players
Association football midfielders
Évreux FC 27 players